Roland Ugrai (born 13 November 1992) is a Hungarian football player who plays for Turkish club Pendikspor.

Club career

Atromitos
On 13 September 2018, Ugrai signed a two-year contract with Superleague club Atromitos. Nine days later he scored his first goal with the greek side in a 2-0 home win against AEL. On 30 September 2018, he sealed a 2-0 away win against Levadiakos. On 3 November 2018, in a 1-1 home win draw against rivals PAOK, he scored with a superb effort as the 25-year-old striker finding himself some space in the box to pick his spot and beat the dive of PAOK goalkeeper Alexandros Paschalakis.

Club statistics

Updated to games played as of 15 May 2022.

International goals
Scores and results list Hungary's goal tally first.

Honours

Ferencváros
Hungarian Cup: 2014–15
Hungarian League Cup: 2014–15
Szuperkupa: 2015

Honvéd
Hungarian Cup: 2019-20

References

External links
Haladas FC
Illes Academia
HLSZ

1992 births
People from Békéscsaba
Sportspeople from Békés County
Living people
Hungarian footballers
Hungary youth international footballers
Hungary under-21 international footballers
Hungary international footballers
Association football forwards
Szombathelyi Haladás footballers
Ferencvárosi TC footballers
Diósgyőri VTK players
Atromitos F.C. players
Budapest Honvéd FC players
Debreceni VSC players
Pendikspor footballers
Nemzeti Bajnokság I players
Nemzeti Bajnokság II players
Super League Greece players
TFF First League players
Hungarian expatriate footballers
Expatriate footballers in Greece
Hungarian expatriate sportspeople in Greece
Expatriate footballers in Turkey
Hungarian expatriate sportspeople in Turkey